Field hockey in Pakistan refers to two teams, the Pakistan men's national field hockey team and the Pakistan women's national field hockey team.

Management
 Pakistan Hockey Federation

PHF Selection Committee

Competitions won

Olympics

1960 Summer Olympics, Rome
1968 Summer Olympics, Mexico
1984 Summer Olympics, Los Angeles

World Cup

 1971 Hockey World Cup, Spain
 1978 Hockey World Cup, Argentina
 1982 Hockey World Cup, India
 1994 Hockey World Cup, Australia

Champions Trophy

 1978 Hockey Champions Trophy, Pakistan
 1980 Hockey Champions Trophy, Pakistan
 1994 Hockey Champions Trophy, Pakistan

National teams
Pakistan men's national field hockey team
Pakistan women's national field hockey team

Men's ranking

Women's ranking

Domestic teams
 Sindh Hockey Team
 Azad Jammu & Kashmir Hockey Team
 Balochistan Hockey Team
 Khyber Pakhtunkhwa Hockey Team
 FATA Hockey Team
 Gilgit-Baltistan Hockey Team
 Punjab Hockey Team
 Islamabad Hockey Team

Notable players
Manzoor Hussain
Shahbaz Ahmed
Nasir Ali
Islah-ud-din
Tahir Zaman
Hassan Sardar
Samiullah Khan
 Kaleemullah Khan 
Shahid Ali Khan
Waseem Feroz
Waseem Ahmad
Munawwaruz Zaman
Tariq Mehmood
Kamran Ashraf
Sohail Abbas
Haider Hussain
Maqsood Hussain
Mahmood Hussain
Shahnaz Sheikh
Mohammed Saqlain
Zeeshan Ashraf
Muhammad Waqas
Naeem Tahir
Tariq Sheikh
Asif Bajwa
Aleem Raza
Anis Ahmed
Zahid Pirzada
Hanif Khan
Naseer Bunda
Akhtar Rasool
Khalid Mahmood
Naveed Alam
Muhammad Saqlain

See also
 Pakistan Hockey Federation

References